Philip of Macedon is a 1727 tragedy by the British writer David Lewis. It is set during the reign of Philip of Macedon.

The original Lincoln's Inn Fields cast included Thomas Walker as Perses, Charles Hulett as Philip, Lacy Ryan as Demetrius, William Milward as Antigonus, John Ogden as Lysimachus, James Quin as Didas, James Lacy as Herodorus, John Berriman as Philocles, Robert Morgan as Xychus, Elizabeth Younger as Olympias and Anne Berriman as Isteria.

References

Bibliography
 Burling, William J. A Checklist of New Plays and Entertainments on the London Stage, 1700-1737. Fairleigh Dickinson Univ Press, 1992.
 Nicoll, Allardyce. A History of Early Eighteenth Century Drama: 1700-1750. CUP Archive, 1927.

1727 plays
British plays
West End plays
Tragedy plays
Plays set in ancient Greece
Plays based on real people
Cultural depictions of Greek kings